Lana Pudar (born 19 January 2006) is a Bosnian competitive swimmer specializing in the butterfly events. She won a gold medal in the women's 200 m butterfly and a bronze medal in the women's 100 m butterfly at the 2022 European Aquatics Championships, a bronze medal in the women's 200 m butterfly at the 2021 FINA World Swimming Championships, and she competed at the 2020 Summer Olympics. She is the national record holder in all six butterfly events, and a Mediterranean games record holder in the 100 m women's butterfly event.

Career
In 2021, at the European Junior Championships, Pudar won a gold medal in the 100 m butterfly and silver medals in the 50 m butterfly and 200 m butterfly.

As the second youngest swimmer at the 2020 Summer Olympics, she finished 19th in the women's 100 metre butterfly.

At the 2021 FINA Short Course World Swimming Championships, Pudar won bronze in the 200 m butterfly and brought Bosnia and Herzegovina its first ever senior international swimming medal. At the 2022 European Aquatics Championships held in Rome, Pudar won gold in the 200 m butterfly and bronze in the 100 m butterfly, breaking national records in both finals.

Results

Individual

Long course

Short course

Personal bests

This list only includes times above 800 Swimming points.

Personal life
Lana is the daughter of former footballer Velibor Pudar.

References

External links

2006 births
Living people
Sportspeople from Mostar
Bosnia and Herzegovina female swimmers
Female butterfly swimmers
Swimmers at the 2020 Summer Olympics
Olympic swimmers of Bosnia and Herzegovina
Medalists at the FINA World Swimming Championships (25 m)
Swimmers at the 2022 Mediterranean Games
Mediterranean Games gold medalists for Bosnia and Herzegovina
Mediterranean Games medalists in swimming
European Aquatics Championships medalists in swimming